Huerfano Butte is a volcanic plug or hypabyssal plug located  north of Walsenburg in Huerfano County, Colorado, United States. Named Huérfano (English: orphan) by early Spanish explorers, it rises above the south side of the Huerfano River with its peak about 200 feet above the floodplain.

A historical marker was placed on the east side of Interstate 25 to commemorate its position near the Trapper's Trail to Taos, New Mexico. It was passed by John Williams Gunnison and John C. Frémont during their surveys for the railroads. Other places are now also named after the butte, Huerfano County and Huerfano River.

See also

List of Colorado mountain ranges
List of Colorado mountain summits
List of Colorado fourteeners
List of Colorado 4000 meter prominent summits
List of the most prominent summits of Colorado
List of Colorado county high points

References

External links

Buttes of Colorado
Landforms of Huerfano County, Colorado
North American 1000 m summits
Volcanic plugs of the United States